Föglö is a group of islands and municipality in Åland, an autonomous territory of Finland.

The municipality is unilingually Swedish, yet in the last decade there has been some immigration from Estonia and Latvia due to the need of employees at the fish farms, the main industry in Föglö. The municipality is connected only by ferries to Lumparland which has a road connection to Mariehamn, and by ferries to mainland Finland.

Erik Adolf von Willebrand discovered von Willebrand disease of the blood by observing a family in Föglö.

See also 
Föglö wreck

References

External links 

 The official website of Föglö

Municipalities of Åland